Rustam Adzhi (born 3 March 1973) is a Ukrainian wrestler. He competed in the 1996 and 2000 Summer Olympics.

References

External links
 

1973 births
Living people
Wrestlers at the 1996 Summer Olympics
Wrestlers at the 2000 Summer Olympics
Ukrainian male sport wrestlers
Olympic wrestlers of Ukraine
Sportspeople from Mariupol
20th-century Ukrainian people
21st-century Ukrainian people